Christopher Kas and Philipp Kohlschreiber were the defending champions, but Kohlschreiber chose not to compete that year.Kas partnered with Mischa Zverev, but lost in the first round to František Čermák and Michal Mertiňák.

Seeds

Draw

Draw

External links
Draw

Stuttgart Open Doubles
Doubles 2009